Stigmella hylomaga is a moth of the family Nepticulidae. It is endemic to Argentina where it is found in Río Negro and Lake Correntoso.

References

Nepticulidae
Moths described in 1931
Endemic fauna of Argentina
Moths of South America